The 2015 Solihull Metropolitan Borough Council election took place on 7 May 2015 to elect members of the Solihull Metropolitan Borough Council in England. It was held on the same day as other local elections and on the same day as the General Election.

The Conservative Party won every seat with 3 exceptions (The Green Party held Chelmsley Wood and Smith's Wood, and UKIP gained Kingshurst and Fordbridge from Labour).

References

2015 English local elections
May 2015 events in the United Kingdom
2015
2010s in the West Midlands (county)